TechCamp may refer to:
 Tech camp, a summer camp which focuses on technology education
 Office of eDiplomacy, which runs a program known as TechCamp